Labeo longipinnis is fish in genus Labeo from the Congo Basin and Lake Tanganyika.

References 

Labeo
Fish described in 1898